Lucy Eleonore Barbara Scherer (born April 5, 1981 in Munich) is a German singer, dancer and actress.

Career
Lucy Scherer was born in Munich and grew up in Regensburg. In childhood, she took ballet and piano lessons, and later gained first experiences at the Stadttheater Regensburg. 1998/1999 she spent a year at the School for Creative and Performing Arts in Cincinnati, Ohio, and received the "Senior Diploma Musical Theatre / Dance." After graduating from Albertus Magnus High School, she studied at the Berlin University of the Arts. She received her diploma with distinction in 2006. In the same year she took over the musical Dance of the Vampires in the theater of the West, the female lead role of Sarah in 2007 and also played in the Swiss premiere of Les Misérables as Eponine.

From November 2007 to January 2010, she played in the German premiere of Wicked at the Palladium Theater Stuttgart the lead role of the witch Glinda. In February 2010, she took over for a short period, the role of Sarah in the musical Dance of the Vampires also Palladium Theater in Stuttgart.

Of 17 January 2011 to 2 September 2011, she starred in the telenovela Hand aufs Herz in the role of Jenny Hartmann. From December 2011 to April 2012 and in May 2012 Lucy Scherer appeared as Ich in Rebecca in Palladium Theater Stuttgart on stage. Also in 2012, she received the lead female role of Marlene Schweitzer in the eighth season of Storm of Love.

From 28 June 2013 to 2 August 2013 Lucy Scherer played Sally Bowles in the musical Cabaret on stage at the theater tent TIPI am Kanzleramt.

Theater

Television

Discography

References

External links

 on Facebook
 on Twitter
 official website

1981 births
Living people
German film actresses
German television actresses
Actresses from Munich